Greensboro station may refer to:

Greensboro station (Washington Metro), a Washington Metro station in Virginia
J. Douglas Galyon Depot, or Greensboro station, an Amtrak station in North Carolina